Richard Holohan (11 January 1882 – 30 May 1954) was an Irish politician. A farmer, he was first elected to Dáil Éireann at the June 1927 general election as a Farmers' Party Teachta Dála (TD) for the Carlow–Kilkenny constituency and he was re-elected at the September 1927 general election. He lost his seat at the 1932 general election, where he stood as an Independent candidate.

He was elected as a National Centre Party TD at the 1933 general election. He became a Fine Gael TD on 8 September 1933 when Cumann na nGaedheal and the National Centre Party, along with the Army Comrades Association merged to form the new party of Fine Gael. He lost his seat at the 1937 general election, standing in the Kilkenny constituency.

References

1882 births
1954 deaths
Farmers' Party (Ireland) TDs
National Centre Party (Ireland) TDs
Fine Gael TDs
Members of the 5th Dáil
Members of the 6th Dáil
Members of the 8th Dáil
Irish farmers